The Socialist Youth League (Socialistiska Ungdomsförbundet) was the youth organization of the Swedish Socialist Party. The organization was formed in 1929. Initially, it was known as the Communist Youth League (Kommunistiska Ungdomsförbundet). KUF changed its name to SU in 1934. 

Along with its mother party, the youth league gradually developed a pro-Nazi position. It disappeared along with its mother party at the end of the Second World War. 

The organ of SU was Avantgardet ("The Vanguard").

Youth wings of communist parties
Youth wings of political parties in Sweden
Communism in Sweden